Merlon Yarde (born 26 April 1944) is a Barbadian cricketer. He played in one first-class match for the Barbados cricket team in 1969/70.

See also
 List of Barbadian representative cricketers

References

External links
 

1944 births
Living people
Barbadian cricketers
Barbados cricketers
People from Christ Church, Barbados